Emamzadeh Shah Alamdar (also Romanized as Emāmzādeh Shāh ‘Alamdār and Emāmzādeh-ye Shāh ’Alamdār; also known as Shāh ‘Alamdār) is a village in Dowbaran Rural District, in the Central District of Zarrin Dasht County, Fars Province, Iran. At the 2006 census, its population was 37, in 7 families.

References 

Populated places in Zarrin Dasht County